Asti is a comune of 74,348 inhabitants (1-1-2021) located in the Piedmont region of northwestern Italy, about  east of Turin in the plain of the Tanaro River. It is the capital of the province of Asti and it is deemed to be the modern capital of Montferrat.

History

Ancient times and early Middle Ages 
People have lived in and around what is now Asti since the Neolithic period. Before their defeat in 174 BC by the Romans, tribes of Ligures, the Statielli, dominated the area and the toponym probably derives from Ast which means "hill" in the ancient Celtic language.

In 124 BC the Romans built a castrum, or fortified camp, which eventually evolved into a full city named Hasta. In 89 BC the city received the status of colonia, and in 49 BC that of municipium. Asti become an important city of the Augustan Regio IX, favoured by its strategic position on the Tanaro river and on the Via Fulvia, which linked Derthona (Tortona) to Augusta Taurinorum (Turin). Other roads connected the city to the main passes for what are today Switzerland and France.

The city was crucial during the early stages of the barbarian invasions which stormed Italy during the fall of the Western Roman Empire. In early 402 AD the Visigoths had invaded northern Italy and were advancing on Mediolanum (modern Milan) which was the imperial capital at that time. Honorius, the young emperor and a resident in that city, unable to wait for promised reinforcements any longer, was compelled to flee from Milan for safety in the city of Arles in Gaul. However, just after his convoy had left Milan and crossed the River Po his escape route through the Alps was cut off by the Gothic cavalry. This forced him to take emergency refuge in the city of Hasta until more Roman troops could be assembled in Italy. The Goths placed Hasta under siege until March when General Stilicho, bringing reinforcements from the Rhine, fought and defeated them at the Battle of Pollentia. After this first victorious defence, thanks to a massive line of walls, Hasta suffered from the barbarian invasions which stormed Italy after the fall of the Western Empire, and declined economically.

In the second half of the 6th century it was chosen as seat for one of the 36 Duchies in which the Lombards divided Italy. The territory of Asti comprised a wide area, stretching out to Albenga and the Maritime Alps. This remained when northern Italy was conquered by the Franks in 774, with the title of County.

In the late Carolingian age Asti was ruled directly by his bishops, who were the main landlords of the area. Most important are Audax (904-926) and Bruningus (937-966), who moved the episcopal seat to the Castel Vecchio ("Old Castle"), where it remained until 1409. The bishopric of Asti remained a powerful entity well into the 11th century, when Pietro II received huge privileges by emperor Henry II. In the second half of the century, Bishop Otto tried to resist the aims of the powerful countess Adelaide of Susa, who damaged the city several times. During Otto's reign, a commune and the consul magistrates are mentioned for the first time (1095).

Local power 

Asti was one of the first free communes of Italy, and in 1140 received the right to mint coins of its own by Conrad II. As the commune, however, had begun to erode the lands of the bishop and other local faudataries, the latter sued for help to Frederick Barbarossa, who presented under the city walls with a huge army in February 1155. After a short siege, Asti was stormed and burnt. Subsequently, Asti adhered to the Lombard League (1169) against the German emperor, but was again defeated in 1174. Despite this, after the Peace of Constance (1183), the city gained further privileges.

The 13th century saw the peak of the Astigiani economic and cultural splendour, only momentarily hindered by wars against Alba, Alessandria, Savoy, Milan (which besieged the city in 1230) and the Marquesses of Montferrat and Saluzzo. In particular, the commune aimed to gain control over the lucrative trade routes leading northwards from the Ligurian ports. In this period, the rise of the Casane Astigiane resulted in contrasting political familial alliances of Guelph and Ghibelline supporters. During the wars led by Emperor Frederick II in northern Italy, the city chose his side: Asti was defeated by the Guelphs of Alessandria at Quattordio and Clamandrana, but thanks to Genoese help, it recovered easily. After Frederick's death, the struggle against Thomas II of Savoy became fierce: the Astigiani defeated him on February 23, 1255, at the Battle of Montebruno, but Thomas (who had been taken prisoner) replied ordering all traders from Asti to be arrested in Savoy and France. This move showed worry on the part of Asti's neighbouring states over the excessive power gained by the city, which had captured Alba and controlled both Chieri and Turin.

This state of affairs led to the intervention of Charles I of Anjou, then King of Naples and the most powerful man in Italy. After some guerrilla actions, Asti signed a pact of alliance with Pavia, Genoa and William VII of Montferrat. In 1274 the Astigiani troops were defeated at the Battle of Cassano, but, on December 12, 1275, were victorious over the Angevins at the Battle of Roccavione, ending Charles' attempt to expand in Piedmont. In the 1290s, after William VII had also been defeated, Asti was the most powerful city in Piedmont. However, internal struggles for the control of trading and banking enterprises soon divided the city into factions. The most prominent faction were the powerful bankers of the Solari family, who, in 1314, gave the city to king Robert of Naples. The free Republic of Asti ceased to exist. In 1339 the Ghibelline exiles recaptured the city, expelling the Solari and their allies. In 1342 however, the menace of the Solari counteroffensive led the new rulers to submit to Luchino Visconti of Milan. Visconti built a citadel and a second ring of walls to protect the new burgs of the city. In 1345, at the Battle of Gamenario, the Ghibelline Astigiani and John II of Montferrat again defeated the Neapolitan troops. John ruled over Asti until 1372, but seven years later the city council submitted to Galeazzo II Visconti's authority. Galeazzo in turn assigned it to Louis of Valois, Duke of Orléans.

French and Savoyard domination 
With the exception of several brief periods under Visconti, Montferrat and Sforza rule, Asti remained under Valois control; it eventually became a direct subject of the French Crown. The situation changed in the early 16th century, during the wars between Charles V and Francis I of France. In 1526 it was besieged in vain by Charles' condottiero Fabrizio Maramaldo. Three years later, the Treaty of Cambrai assigned Asti to the German emperor, who in turn gave it to the viceroy of Naples Charles de Lannoy. After the death of the latter, Charles included it in Beatrice of Portugal's dowry, when she married Charles III of Savoy.

Asti was one of the main Savoyard strongholds in later wars. In 1616, besieged by the Spanish governor of Milan, it was defended by Duke Charles Emmanuel I himself. In 1630–31, the city suffered a high mortality rate from an outbreak of the plague. Some years later Asti was conquered by the Spanish, although Savoy regained the city in 1643. Another unsuccessful Spanish siege occurred in 1650. In November 1703, during the War of Spanish Succession, Asti fell to France again; it was reconquered in 1705 by Victor Amadeus II. In 1745 French troops invaded the city once more, but it was liberated the following year.

In 1797 the Astigiani, enraged by the continuous military campaigns and by their resulting poor economic situation, revolted against the Savoyard government. On July 28 the Repubblica Astese was declared. However, it was suppressed only two days later. The revolutionary chiefs were arrested and executed. The following year the Savoyards were expelled from Piedmont by the French revolutionary army, and Asti was occupied by general Montrichard. After a short reversal, the French returned after the victory at Marengo (1800) near to Alessandra. Napoleon himself visited Asti on April 29, 1805, but was received rather coldly by the citizens. The city was demoted and incorporated with Alessandra under the department of Marengo. After the end of the French empire, Asti returned to Piedmont in 1814; the city followed Piedmontese history until the unification of Italy in 1861.

Geography

Climate 
Asti has a continental climate which is moderated by the proximity of the Mediterranean sea: its winters are warmer, and its summers cooler than Turin. Rain falls mostly during the spring and autumn; during the hottest months rain is less common, but stronger when it does occur, usually in thunderstorms. During November and December in particular, the town of Asti can be prone to fog, which is less common in the higher-altitude areas that surround it.

Government

Main sights 
Sections of the ancient city walls remain on the north side of the city and in the late 20th-century building work uncovered a section of Roman wall in the center of the city.

The area to the northwest of the city, between the centre and the cathedral, is rich in medieval palaces and merchants houses, many with monumental towers. Asti was known as the city of 100 towers (although there were 120 in total) of which several still remain, among them, the Tower of the Comentini (13th century), the octagonal Torre de Regibus and Torre Troyana (13th century), as well as the ancient Torre Rossa, built during the reign of the Roman Emperor Augustus.

Asti is the home to several old churches. These include:
Cathedral of Santa Maria Assunta (built in the 13th century over another Cathedral), one of the biggest in Piedmont, in Romanesque-Gothic style. The monument belfry is from 1266. the façade is characterized by three portals, each surmounted by a big rose-window. The interior, with a nave and two aisles, houses a cycle of 18th-century frescoes, some altarpieces by Gandolfino d'Asti and precious silver artworks from the 15th-16th centuries. The presbytery has a noteworthy mosaic floor, from the pre-existing church. Next to the last pilasters of the nave are two 14th century artworks, the funerary seal of bishop Baldracco Malabaila and the equestrian portrait of Arricino Moneta.
Collegiata di San Secondo (13th century) in the old medieval centre next to the Palazzo Civico.  It is dedicated to the city's patron saint, Secundus of Asti.  The crypt is from the 6th century. The façade has three notable Gothic portals, while the interior houses a polyptych by Gandolfino d'Asti and other works.
Santa Maria Nuova (11th century).
San Martino, First mentioned in 886, the old Gothic edifice was dismantled in 1696 and rebuilt along Baroque lines in 1736.
Sant'Anastasio (8th-12th century), whose museum has some antique capitals and sculptures.
Santa Caterina Baroque church
Baptistery of San Pietro(12th century) building from the High Middle Ages in the city. It has octagonal plan with a wide dome.
San Pietro in Consavia (15th century), with elegant external decorations. It the seat of the Archaeological Museum, with Roman and Egyptian works.

There is a synagogue and a museum depicting the history of Asti's Jewish community, whose presence is documented since 812.

Events 

One of the most famous events held in Asti is the famous Palio di Asti, in which all the old town wards, called "Rioni" and "Borghi" plus nearby towns compete in a bare-back horse race. This event recalls a victory in battle versus the rival city Alba, during the Middle Ages after the victorious battle a race was held around Alba's walls, from then on every year in Asti. Asti's Palio is the oldest recorded one in Italy, and in modern times is held in the triangular Piazza Alfieri preceded by a medieval pageant through the old town on the 3rd Sunday of September.

Wine 

The three neighbouring Provinces of Asti, Cuneo, and Alessandria incorporate the Langhe and Monferrato Hills region in the centre of Piedmont, limestone and sandstone deposits laid down by the retreating Adriatic some 5 million years ago, and are home to some of Italy's most known red wines, plus some white ones.

Asti is the center of production of the sparkling Asti (DOCG, often known as Asti Spumante). Asti is typically sweet and low in alcohol (often below 8%). It is made solely from the moscato bianco white muscat grape. Other wines include a premium version known as Moscato d'Asti (DOCG) and the red  Barbera.

The first products from the province of Asti to become known internationally are Martini and Rossi, Gancia and Riccadonna, which made commercial wines like Asti Spumante; red wines such as Barbera d'Asti, Freisa d'Asti, Grignolino d'Asti, Bonarda, Grignolino and Ruché di Castagnole Monferrato are also becoming widespread worldwide. These wines and many others can be sampled during the week-long Douja d'Or wine exhibition which is held at the same time as the Palio and Sagre.

The first documentation on the variety Freisa d'Asti are from the beginning of the 16th century.

Food 
Asti is also famous for its Asti's Festival of Festivals, held in September a week before the Palio. During the festival most of the towns in Asti's province meet in a great square called "Campo del Palio", here they offer typical food and wine for which they are known. On the Sunday of the Sagre all the towns involved stage a parade with floats depicting traditional farming with everyone in costume along Asti's roads to reach "Campo del Palio" square.

Asti province becomes a gourmand's delight from October to December in the white truffle or "tartufo bianco" season. Although neighbouring Alba is better known for its October truffle fair, some of the best truffles are found around Asti's hills, and every weekend there is a local truffle festival.

Sport
The main football club of the town was Asti Calcio F.C. (ex-A.C.D. Asti), which folded in 2017. Another football club, A.S.D. Colline Alfieri Don Bosco (ex-A.C. Celle, from Celle Enomondo), relocated to the city and was renamed to "A.S.D. Alfieri Asti" in 2017. Since 2019 it was known as A.S.D. Asti.

Former futsal league champion, A.S.D. Asti Calcio a 5 is also based in Asti.

Transport 
Asti railway station, opened in 1849, forms part of the Turin–Genoa and Castagnole–Asti–Mortara railways.  It is also a junction for two other lines, to Genoa and Chivasso, respectively.

People 

People from Asti include:
Gandolfino d'Asti, or Gandolfino da Roreto (active 1493–1518) Renaissance painter
Vittorio Alfieri (1749–1803), a dramatist who has been described as the "founder of Italian tragedy"
Isaac Artom (1829 –1900), writer, diplomat, and politician
Michelangelo Pittatore (1825–1903), portrait painter
Umberto Cagni (1863–1932), polar explorer and admiral
Carlo Alberto Castigliano (1847–1884), mathematician and physicist
Mikhail Tsvet (Михаил Семёнович Цвет, also spelled Tsvett, Tswett, Tswet, Zwet, and Cvet; 1872–1919) Russian-Italian botanist and inventor of chromatography
Ettore Desderi (1892–1974), composer best known for his sacred music
Paolo Conte (born 1937), painter, poet and songwriter
Giovanni Goria (1943–1994), Christian Democratic politician, prime minister of Italy from 1987 until 1988
Giorgio Faletti (1950–2014), writer, actor and singer-songwriter
Maurizio Lobina (born 1973), dance musician and member of worldwide famous dance music band Eiffel 65, and ex-member of Bloom 06
Matteo Paro (born 1983), footballer
Rinaldo Capello (born 1964), driver, three times winner of 24 Hours of Le Mans
Fabio Mengozzi (born 1980), pianist and composer
 One of Pope Francis's cousins is from Asti; Francis's father emigrated to Argentina from the territory of the Asti Diocese

Frazioni

The Asti comune consists of the following frazioni:

Casabianca, Castiglione, Mombarone, Montegrosso, Montemarzo, Poggio D'Asti, Quarto D'Asti, Revignano, San Marzanotto, Serravalle, Sessant, Stazione Di Portacomaro, Vaglierano, Valgera, Valleandona, Valletanaro, Variglie, Viatosto, Avidano, Baciglio, Balestrino, Barbantana, Belangero, Beneficio-Stangona, Biamini, Bramairate, Bricchetto, Bricco Modena, Briccolino, Burie, Cà Dei Coppi, Carretti, Cascin Ruasin, Cascina Angelo, Cascina Conti, Cascina Fanfarina, Cascina Fontana, Cascina Gioia, Cascina Stella, Cascine Artiglione, Cascine Roasio, Ceresa, Cravera, Distretto, Fornaca, Ghirlandina, Gianotti, Giberto, Lama-Garoppa, Madonna Di Caniglie, Madonna Di Viatosto, Malandroni, Manina, Manzoni, Matei, Meridiana, Olivero, Palucco, Quaranta, Quarto, Roccaschiavino, Rocche Di Callianetto, Rossi, San Giuseppe, San Grato, San Marzanotto Piana, San Sebastiano, Stazione Di Sessant, Torrazzo, Vaglierano Basso, Vairo, Valcossana-Grilletto, Valenzani, Valfea, Valmairone, Vareglio.

International relations 

Asti is twinned with:
 Miami-Dade, Florida, United States, since 1985
 Valence, France, since 1966
 Biberach an der Riß, Germany
 Ma'alot-Tarshiha, Israel
 Nanyang, Henan, China

See also
Roman Catholic Diocese of Asti

References

External links 

 
Hasta in The Princeton Encyclopedia of Classical Sites.
OASI Organization for Computer Science Development in Asti
Asti Restaurant Guide from ChefMoz, part of the Open Directory Project
Italian wine exploration map A complete guide of Italian wine
Traditional food of Alessandria Piemont Site dedicated to traditional Italian cuisine

 
Roman towns and cities in Italy
Cities and towns in Piedmont